Richard O. Flynn (born July 17, 1943) is a former American football player and coach. He served as the head football coach at Central Michigan University from 1994 to 1999, compiling a record of 30–37.

Career
Flynn played football at Michigan State from 1962 to 1964. At the end of his senior year he won the Ross Trophy, given annually to the best scholar-athlete. Following his graduation from Michigan State he served as an assistant coach at Lansing Eastern High School from 1965–1966 before serving four years in the United States Air Force as a lieutenant. He returned to Eastern High School in 1971 as head football coach, a position he would occupy until 1977.

Central Michigan promoted Herb Deromedi, its defensive coordinator, to become head football coach in 1978 on the unexpected departure of Roy Kramer. Deromedi brought in Flynn as one of several defensive assistants, with responsibility for linebackers. Also on staff was future Notre Dame head coach Tyrone Willingham (secondary). Flynn was de facto coordinator during the 1978 season, and was formally given the title in 1979.

Flynn succeeded Deromedi as head coach after the 1993 season when the latter became athletic director. Flynn had been assistant head coach, in addition to defensive coordinator, from 1992–1993. After his resignation as Central Michigan's head coach toward the end of the 1999 season, Flynn served as an assistant coach at Indiana (2000–2001), Akron (2002–2003), and Eastern Michigan (2004–2005).

Head coaching record

College

References

1943 births
Living people
American football ends
American football tackles
Akron Zips football coaches
Central Michigan Chippewas football coaches
Eastern Michigan Eagles football coaches
Indiana Hoosiers football coaches
Michigan State Spartans football players
High school football coaches in Michigan
United States Air Force officers
People from Mount Pleasant, Michigan
Military personnel from Michigan